The  Asian Baseball Championship was the second continental tournament held by the Baseball Federation of Asia. The tournament was held in Manila, Philippines for the second time. Won by Japan, it was the first of what would be three consecutive Asian Championship wins in a row. Taiwan (2nd), South Korea (3rd) and Philippines (4th) were the other participants.

References

Bibliography 
 

Asian Baseball Championship
International baseball competitions hosted by the Philippines
1955 in Philippine sport
Sports competitions in Manila
20th century in Manila